Where the Beat Meets the Street is the second studio album by Grateful Dead rhythm guitarist Bob Weir and his side-project, Bobby and the Midnites. The album reached number 166 on the Billboard 200.

Track listing
"(I Want to Live in) America" (John Perry Barlow, Gerrit Graham, Bobby Cochran, Bob Weir)
"Where the Beat Meets the Street" (Nicky Chinn, Steve Glen)
"She's Gonna Win Your Heart" (Billy Burnette, Mentor Williams)
"Ain't That Peculiar" (Warren Moore, Smokey Robinson, Bobby Rogers, Marvin Tarplin)
"Lifeguard" (Peter Beckett, Dennis Lambert)
"Rock in the 80's" (Cochran)
"Lifeline" (Frederiksen, Haselden, Medica, Roddy)
"Falling" (Barlow, Jeff Baxter, Kenny Gradney, Weir)
"Thunder & Lightning" (Cochran, Weir)
"Gloria Monday" (Barlow, Baxter, Weir)

Credits

Musicians
Bob Weir – guitar, vocals
Jeff Baxter – guitar, synthesizer
Paulette Brown – vocals
Billy Cobham – drums
Bobby Cochran – guitar, vocals
Steve Cropper – guitar
Paulinho Da Costa – percussion
Chuck Domenico – bass guitar
Jim Ehinger – keyboards
Kenny Gradney – bass, vocals
Alphonso Johnson – bass
Sherlie Matthews – vocals
Brian Setzer – guitar

Production
Producer – Jeff Baxter
Production coordinators – Marylata Elton and David Richman
Engineer – Larold Rebhun
Assistant engineers – John Bogosian, David Ferguson and Mark Wilczak
Mastering – Elliot Federman
Design & redesign – David Richman
Photography – Glenn Wexler
Art direction – Joel Zimmerman
Coordination – Doug Wygal and Jamie Reamer

References

Bobby and the Midnites albums
1984 albums
Columbia Records albums